Grommet is a ring in material. It might also refer to:

Grommet (sportsperson), juvenile sportsperson
Grommet (ears), part of a medical procedure
Operation Grommet, a series of nuclear tests

See also
Gromit, animated character